Wild tomato is the common name of the Lycopersicon genus of plants in the family Solanaceae.

Wild Tomato may also refer to:

 WildTomato, a popular lifestyle magazine in New Zealand